Armatophallus kuehnei is a moth of the family Gelechiidae. It is found in Rwanda.

The wingspan is 16–17.1 mm. The forewings are light brown, the base mottled with black. Black-tipped scales form a broad pattern along the costal margin from one-fourth to three-fourths, there are two indistinct black dots at the base of the cell and one in the corner of the cell. There are diffuse grey spots before the apex on both margins. The hindwings are dark grey. Adults have been recorded on wing in September.

Etymology
The species is named in honour of Lars Kühne, who collected the type series.

References

Moths described in 2015
Armatophallus